Sir Isaac Lyon Goldsmid, 1st Baronet (13 January 1778 – 27 April 1859) was a financier and one of the leading figures in the Jewish emancipation in the United Kingdom, who became the first British Jew to receive a hereditary title.

Biography

Birth
Isaac Goldsmid was born in London on 13 January 1778.

Career
He began in business with a firm of bullion brokers, Mocatta & Goldsmid (estab. 1684), to the Bank of England and the East India Company. He became a partner in Mocatta & Goldsmid and amassed a large fortune. Isaac Goldsmid was made Baron da Palmeira by the Portuguese government in 1846 for services rendered in settling a monetary dispute between Portugal and Brazil.

Moreover, he assisted by his capital and his enterprise to build some of the railways in southern England and also the London docks.

Philanthropy
He is chiefly known for his efforts to obtain the emancipation of the Jews in England and for his part in founding University College London. The Jewish Disabilities Bill, first introduced in Parliament by Sir Robert Grant in 1830, owed its final passage through the House of Lords in 1858 to Goldsmid's energetic work.

He helped to establish the University College Hospital in 1834, serving as its treasurer for eighteen years, and also aided in the efforts to obtain reform in the English penal code.

In 1841, he became the first (unconverted to Christianity) Jewish baronet, the honour being conferred upon him by Lord Melbourne. He was a made a Fellow of the Royal Society in 1828, presumably for his part in the foundation of UCL.

Personal life and death
He married his cousin Isabel and their second son was Sir Francis Goldsmid, 2nd Baronet (1808–1878). In 1849, he bought Somerhill House near Tonbridge, Kent. He died on 27 April 1859. Upon his death, it passed to his son Frederick.

See also
Goldsmid family – article about the Goldsmid family
History of the Jews in England

References

Sources

External links
Jewish Encyclopedia

1778 births
1859 deaths
English philanthropists
English Jews
English people of Dutch-Jewish descent
Fellows of the Royal Society
Businesspeople from London
People associated with University College London
Baronets in the Baronetage of the United Kingdom
Isaac
Burials at Balls Pond Road Cemetery
Jewish British philanthropists
Committee members of the Society for the Diffusion of Useful Knowledge